This is a list of mayors who served the city of Fort Worth, Texas, USA.

*Dates given by Fort Worth Mayor's office.

References

Fort Worth, Texas

Government of Fort Worth, Texas